The 2009 season was Malmö FF's 98th in existence, their 74th season in Allsvenskan and their 9th consecutive season in the league. They competed in Allsvenskan where they finished in 7th position and Svenska Cupen where they were knocked out in the third round. The season was the club's first at Swedbank Stadion, having moved from Malmö Stadion after the 2008 season. The first league match at Swedbank Stadion was played against Örgryte IS on 13 April and won 3–0 by Malmö FF.

Players

Squad

Players in/out

In

Out

Squad stats

Disciplinary record

Club

Coaching staff

Other information

Competitions

Overall

Allsvenskan

League table

Results summary

Results by round

Matches
Kickoff times are in CET.

Svenska Cupen

Non competitive

Pre-season

Mid-season

References 
 

Malmö FF seasons
Malmo FF